Little Noah: Scion of Paradise is a 2022 action role-playing game developed by Cygames and Grounding Inc. for Nintendo Switch, PlayStation 4, and Windows.

Development
Little Noah: Scion of Paradise was released for Nintendo Switch, PlayStation 4, and Windows on 28 June 2022. The game repurposes assets from Cygames' 2015 game Battle Champs, including the soundtrack composed by Hitoshi Sakimoto. Its service ended in January 2019.

References

2022 video games
Action role-playing video games
Fantasy video games
Fiction about alchemy
Cygames franchises
Nintendo Switch games
Platform games
PlayStation 4 games
Roguelike video games
Windows games
Video games developed in Japan
Video games featuring female protagonists
Video games scored by Hitoshi Sakimoto
Video games using procedural generation